The 1994 Centennial Cup is the 24th Junior "A" 1994 ice hockey National Championship for the Canadian Junior A Hockey League.

The Centennial Cup was competed for by the winners of the Doyle Cup, Anavet Cup, Dudley Hewitt Cup, the Eastern Canadian Champion and a host city.

The tournament was hosted by the Olds Grizzlys and Olds, Alberta.

The Playoffs

Round Robin

Results
Olds Grizzlys defeat Chateauguay Elites 11-3
Kelowna Spartans defeat Weyburn Red Wings 5-2
Chateauguay Elites defeat Antigonish Bulldogs 9-1
Kelowna Spartans defeat Antigonish Bulldogs 5-4
Olds Grizzlys defeat Weyburn Red Wings 5-0 for the Abbott Cup
Weyburn Red Wings defeat Antigonish Bulldogs 4-3 in Double Overtime
Chateauguay Elites defeat Weyburn Red Wings 6-3
Olds Grizzlys defeat Kelowna Spartans 5-2
Kelowna Spartans defeat Chateauguay Elites 9-6
Olds Grizzlys defeat Antigonish Bulldogs 10-1

Semi and Finals

Please Note: The final was won in Overtime

Awards
Most Valuable Player: Tyler Graham (Olds Grizzlys)
Top Scorer: Martin Duval (Chateauguay Elites)
Most Sportsmanlike Player: Bill Muckalt (Kelowna Spartans)

All-Star Team
Forward
Christian Desrochers (Chateauguay Elites)
Joe Murphy (Olds Grizzlys)
Martin Duval (Chateauguay Elites)
Defence
John Dlouhy (Olds Grizzlys)
Chad Sturrock (Olds Grizzlys)
Goal
Travis Kirby (Weyburn Red Wings)

Roll of League Champions
AJHL: Olds Grizzlys
BCHL: Kelowna Spartans
CJHL: Gloucester Rangers
MJHL: St. Boniface Saints
MJAHL: Antigonish Bulldogs
MetJHL: Wexford Raiders
NOJHL: Powassan Hawks
OPJHL: Orillia Terriers
PCJHL: Kimberley Dynamiters
QPJHL: Chateauguay Elites
SJHL: Weyburn Red Wings

See also
Canadian Junior A Hockey League
Royal Bank Cup
Anavet Cup
Doyle Cup
Dudley Hewitt Cup
Fred Page Cup
Abbott Cup
Mowat Cup

External links
Royal Bank Cup Website

1994
Cup